The Butte County Board of Supervisors is the governing body of Butte County, California. The board consists of five members elected by district for four-year terms. As of January 19, 2022, the board of supervisors consisted of Bill Connelly, Tami Ritter, Debra Lucero, Steve Lambert, and Doug Teeter.

Board of Supervisors
County government in California
County governing bodies in the United States